Stricklandiana is a genus of beetles in the family Carabidae, containing the following species:

 Stricklandiana batantae (Baehr, 1997) 
 Stricklandiana carinata (Baehr, 1997) 
 Stricklandiana contracta (Louwerens, 1956) 
 Stricklandiana glabrimargo (Baehr, 1997) 
 Stricklandiana lata (Darlington, 1968) 
 Stricklandiana longicornis (Baehr, 1997) 
 Stricklandiana marginalis (Louwerens, 1969) 
 Stricklandiana nigra (Sloane, 1907) 
 Stricklandiana pericalloides (W.J.Macleay, 1886)
 Stricklandiana setosa (Baehr, 1997)

References

Lebiinae